Five Nights at Freddy's: Security Breach is a 2021 survival horror video game developed by Steel Wool Studios and published by ScottGames. It is the eighth main installment in the Five Nights at Freddy's series and the thirteenth game overall, taking place after the events of Five Nights at Freddy's: Help Wanted. The game differs from other installments in the franchise, featuring only one night instead of five and having free-roam gameplay. The player takes the role of a young boy named Gregory, who must evade hostile animatronic characters and a female night guard in a large shopping mall, unveiling its morbid secrets while trying to survive until morning.

The game was released digitally on December 16, 2021, for Microsoft Windows, PlayStation 4, and PlayStation 5, with ports for other platforms planned to be released at later dates. The physical release for PlayStation 4 and PlayStation 5 was released on April 1, 2022. Xbox One and Xbox Series X/S versions of the game were released on November 22, 2022. The game received mixed reviews from critics. A free DLC expansion titled Ruin was announced for release in 2023.

Gameplay 
The player takes control of a young boy named Gregory, who is locked in the "Freddy Fazbear's Mega Pizzaplex", a large shopping mall filled with murderous animatronics and must complete numerous missions to survive the night in order to escape. The 1980s — or "Glamrock"-styled animatronics found throughout the mall include Glamrock Freddy, Glamrock Chica, Montgomery Gator, Roxanne Wolf, the Daycare Attendant, the Glamrock Endoskeletons, the Wind-Up Music Men, and DJ Music Man. Gregory will also encounter other types of enemies, such as Vanessa, the mall's security guard who also turns out to be Vanny, a corrupt and murderous woman in a rabbit suit; and the S.T.A.F.F. robots that can alert enemies to Gregory's location if spotted/offer him a map if the S.T.A.F.F. robots are a map provider. 

Unlike previous iterations where Freddy is a prominent antagonist, Glamrock Freddy helps Gregory evade his fellow animatronics. Freddy has a compartment in his stomach that is "reserved for oversized birthday cakes and piñatas" that Gregory uses to hide in. While inside Freddy's "birthday cake hatch", Gregory can see through Freddy's eyes and can use him to get past most other animatronics without trouble; this will not fool the enemies Moon and Vanny, however. Also, Freddy has limited battery power, and if he is low on it, he will need to recharge at a charging station, as he will malfunction and kill Gregory if he is inside of him when his power runs out. Freddy receives hardware upgrades throughout the game's progression, and can acquire two extensions to his battery life as well as the abilities to overload voice-activated locks and stun other robots, break open chain-locked fences, and locate collectible items. Freddy can also give Gregory advice, shortcuts, or warnings about the challenges and enemies he will face in the mall. 

All enemies will get stronger as the night progresses, so the player must adapt to their surroundings in order to survive. Gregory can hide to avoid enemies or knock over objects to distract them. Running drains stamina and if it's low, Gregory will not be able to move fast. Some confrontations will require the use of strategy in order to avoid being caught. Gregory has a flashlight that he can use to see in dark places and carries a device called a "Faz-Watch" on his wrist, where he can access the missions, camera system, and his location in the mall, as well as communicate with Freddy. However, the flashlight has limited power and needs to be recharged frequently. There are also two kinds of weapons that can be used to temporarily stun some enemies: the "Faz Camera" and the "Fazerblaster". The Faz Camera can stun all susceptible enemies in front of the player, but it has a lengthy recharging time between uses. The Fazerblaster can be fired more frequently than the Faz Camera, with six shots before needing to recharge, but only stuns one animatronic or S.T.A.F.F. and only with a successful shot to the head. 
There are multiple paths and endings depending on the choices made throughout the game. Office escapes are also featured. Unlike previous games, this game allows free roaming and combat, features boss battles (with some being optional), and instead of five nights, the entire game takes place in a single night that lasts six in-game hours, with time only progressing alongside the story. Minigames are also featured as arcade games.

Plot 
In the Freddy Fazbear's Mega Pizzaplex, a large shopping mall centered around its animatronic mascots, Glamrock Freddy Fazbear (Kellen Goff), Glamrock Chica (Heather Masters), Montgomery "Monty" Gator (Cameron Miller) and Roxanne "Roxy" Wolf (Marta Svetek) are getting ready to perform for an audience. During the performance, Freddy suffers a technical malfunction and shuts down, collapsing on the stage and cutting the performance short.

Freddy awakens back in his room in Rockstar Row, where he discovers that a young boy named Gregory (Marta Svetek) is hiding inside his stomach compartment. Vanessa (Heather Masters), the female security nightguard and only human on staff for the night, orders all animatronics and employee robots—most of which have mysteriously become aggressive unbeknownst to her—to search for Gregory. However, Freddy's malfunction and Gregory's fear of Vanessa causes him to disobey the guard's orders and instead guide Gregory to the lobby, only for the mall to lock down for the night, trapping Gregory inside. Freddy continues to help Gregory survive the night until they find another way out or the front doors re-open at 6:00 a.m. After eluding Vanessa and the animatronics and taking refuge in a security office, Gregory manages to gain access to the mall's surveillance system. In an effort to obtain high-level security badges in order to access certain areas of the mall, Gregory enters the mall's daycare and encounters the Daycare Attendant (Kellen Goff) in his friendly but overbearing Sun form. A power outage forces Gregory to confront Sun's hostile alter ego, Moon. Gregory manages to restore power to the daycare, but Sun kicks Gregory out for turning the lights off and alerts the animatronics of his location before he is rescued by Freddy.

Gregory is captured by Vanessa and is later confined in a Lost & Found room. Suddenly, Vanny (Marta Svetek)—a woman in a white patchwork rabbit costume who was responsible for reprogramming the animatronics to kill Gregory—approaches him, and he escapes before reuniting with Freddy. Gregory and Freddy venture into the basement, where Moon ambushes them and captures Freddy. Gregory proceeds throughout the basement and avoids animatronic endoskeletons, before finding Freddy being interrogated and threatened by Vanessa. Vanessa states that there is no record of Gregory in the mall database, and accuses Freddy for colluding with Gregory. Once Vanessa leaves and he frees and repairs Freddy, Gregory is faced with exploring the atrium's attractions in order to battle either Monty for his claws or Chica for her voice box to upgrade Freddy with, acquiring a tool that can temporarily disorient animatronics and S.T.A.F.F. along the way. After installing Monty's claws or Chica's voice box, Gregory and Freddy evade the large DJ Music Man and forcefully takes Roxy's eyes to further enhance Freddy. 

6:00 a.m. arrives shortly after the ocular upgrade is completed, and the mall's doors open, but Vanessa broadcasts a message urging Gregory to meet her for a reward. The "reward" is revealed to be several recorded messages of Vanessa and an unknown woman undergoing therapy sessions. Gregory has the choice of either leaving the mall, staying to continue exploring the mall's secrets and trying to solve the remaining mysteries, or confronting Vanny, who was also responsible for several missing children cases within the mall.

Endings 
A total of six endings exist for the game, each marked with one to three golden stars upon their final cutscenes.
 ★ Alley ending — If Gregory leaves through the mall's main entrance, he is revealed to be homeless and returns to the cardboard box he has been residing in, using a newspaper with photos of the previous missing children on the front page as a blanket. Gregory tries to fall asleep as Vanny's shadow fills the foggy alleyway, indicating that Vanny has found him.
 ★★ Getaway ending — If Gregory leaves through the loading dock, he manages to escape with Freddy in a van and uses its battery to recharge Freddy after he runs out of power. A newspaper article reports that Freddy has been replaced with a Glamrock Mr. Hippo playing the triangle, while Monty replaces his position as lead vocalist.
 ★★ Burntrap ending — If the player backtracks to defeat either Monty or Chica to fully upgrade Freddy, then Gregory and Freddy can progress underneath the construction in Roxy's Raceway and find the buried ruins of the burned-down Freddy Fazbear's Pizza Place, which had sunk underground through a sinkhole and was further buried by the mall's trash. Freddy remembers that he was brought there by Vanny in the past, to clear a path to an unknown location in the restaurant's basement level. They encounter a monstrous amalgamation of older animatronics, dubbed "the Blob". The spirit of William Afton, Fazbear Entertainment's co-founder and an undead serial killer who had been manipulating events behind the scenes after previously brainwashing Vanny, emerges in a partially restored "Burntrap" body and attempts to take control of Freddy, forcing Gregory to fight Afton, the Blob, and the remains of Chica, Monty, and Roxy alone while under threat of Freddy turning against him. The battle causes the ruins to burn down and forces Gregory and Freddy to flee. The Blob drags Afton away, leaving their fates unknown, enabling the protagonists' escape from the burning mall. The two find rest atop a hill, enjoying the sunrise. This ending is considered to be canon, and leads into the upcoming 2023 DLC Ruin.
 ★★ To the Rooftop ending — If a certain number of collectibles are collected and Freddy is upgraded, Gregory and Freddy decide to burn down the mall using flammable plushies before they are confronted by Vanny on the roof. Freddy tackles Vanny off the roof, destroying them both; Gregory unmasks Vanny, who turns out to be Vanessa. Vanessa's spirit, standing on the rooftop, sadly looks down at her and Freddy's bodies as the flames grow bigger. A news article reports that the mall has burnt down and that flammable Fazbear toys have been recalled.
 ★★ Disassemble Vanny ending — If Gregory and Freddy decide to fight Vanny in her hideout in Fazer Blast, Vanny will order the S.T.A.F.F. robots to disassemble Freddy, forcing Gregory to face her alone. He manages to grab Vanny's device and orders the robots to "disassemble" her. Gregory approaches the damaged Freddy, who gives words of comfort before he shuts down. A news article reports that the mall has closed due to health concerns and plans to reopen next season.
 ★★★ Redemption ending — If Gregory completes the three Princess Quest arcade games instead of deciding to kill Vanny, he finds the mall's robots have shut down and Vanny's mask has been discarded. He escapes with Freddy's still-active head in a duffel bag, with Vanessa joining him. The three rest atop a hill, enjoying the sunrise as Gregory and Vanessa eat ice cream.

Development and release 
On August 8, 2019, on the first game's fifth anniversary, Scott Cawthon posted a new teaser on his website, teasing the eighth installment for the series. The teaser depicts a modern shopping mall containing '80s-style versions of Freddy, Chica, and two new animatronics playing for an excited crowd. Throughout the following months, various characters in the game were shown throughout several teasers such as the new animatronics and the character Vanny from Help Wanted. On April 21, 2020, the characters' names were leaked from Funko's list of upcoming products and the title was revealed to be Five Nights at Freddy's: Pizza Plex. The following day, Cawthon confirmed the leaks, but that the title is not official. Cawthon also announced that the game was scheduled to be released in late 2020.

On September 16, 2020, a teaser trailer for the game was launched during the PlayStation 5 Showcase event, revealing new rooms along with the main lobby and new animatronics. At the end of the presentation, it was announced that the game would be released on PC, PlayStation 4, and PlayStation 5, and may come to other platforms at a later date. However, on November 17, Cawthon announced that, due to the COVID-19 pandemic and new additions to the game, the game had been delayed to early 2021.

On February 25, 2021, during Sony Interactive Entertainment's State of Play live stream, the first gameplay trailer was released, showcasing various areas and characters in the game.

On September 1, 2021, Steel Wool launched a new website, titled Security Breach TV, to host new teasers for Security Breach. Just a week later on September 7, the first video teaser was posted on Security Breach TV in the style of an old-fashioned cartoon, called Freddy & Friends: On Tour!, featuring the main four characters from the original game. Throughout the following months, the website was updated with more video teasers containing secret images and teasers inside the videos.

During a PlayStation State of Play on October 27, 2021, the final trailer was showcased, featuring the other Glamrock animatronics as well as gameplay, cutscenes and mechanics. The game's release date was also revealed to be December 16, 2021. Ports for the Xbox One and Xbox Series X/S is slated for a  November 22, 2022 release.

An update was released on February 28, 2022, which fixed many glitches and bugs present in the game, while also making the difficulty of the game easier.

Spin-off 
On April 28, 2021, Cawthon announced that, due to the unexpected size of the game, its release was delayed further. As compensation for the players, Cawthon released a freeware beat 'em up spin-off game titled Security Breach: Fury's Rage.

Tie-in media and merchandise 
Before the release of Security Breach, on October 30, 2020, Funko released a line of action figures of the Glamrock animatronics and collectible mystery minis. On May 20, 2021, Funko also released two 12" statues: one of Glamrock Freddy and Gregory hiding from Vanny and the other of Vanny and the night guard Vanessa on opposite sides of a potted plant.

Downloadable content 
On May 30, 2022, a free DLC expansion titled Ruin was announced and is set for release in 2023.

Reception

Critical reception 

Five Nights at Freddy's: Security Breach received "mixed or average" reviews, according to review aggregator Metacritic. Jeuxvideo.com gave a mixed review, praising the atmosphere and the originality of certain gameplay sections, but criticizing the bugs and technical issues. The Escapists Ben "Yahtzee" Croshaw was more critical of the game, praising the visuals, but criticizing the bugs, design, and restrictive save system. He would later list Security Breach as being his least favourite game of 2022 based on these factors.

Accolades 
The game was nominated for and won Players' Choice December 2021 on PlayStation's official blog.

The Freddy & Friends: On Tour! animated teasers on the Security Breach TV website were nominated in October 2022 for a Streamy Award for Brand Engagement.

Notes

References

External links 
 Official website
 Security Breach official website
 

2021 video games
Five Nights at Freddy's
2020s horror video games
Indie video games
PlayStation 4 games
PlayStation 5 games
Single-player video games
Stadia games
Unreal Engine games
Video games about robots
Video games developed in the United States
Video games set in Utah
Video games with alternate endings
Windows games
Works about missing people
Xbox One games
Xbox Series X and Series S games